Ohio and Pennsylvania Railroad may refer to:

Ohio and Pennsylvania Railroad (1848–1856), later part of the Pennsylvania Railroad
Ohio and Pennsylvania Railroad (1995–present), a short line in northeast Ohio